Roy Douglas Sharplin (born November 18, 1966, in Toronto) is a Canadian slalom canoer who competed from the late 1980s to the late 1990s. He finished 22nd in the C-1 event at the 1992 Summer Olympics in Barcelona.

References
Sports-reference.com profile

1966 births
Canadian male canoeists
Canoeists at the 1992 Summer Olympics
Living people
Canoeists from Toronto
Olympic canoeists of Canada
20th-century Canadian people